Wuchaomen Park is a park located in Baixia District, Nanjing, China. The site once the forbidden grounds of a Ming Palace and has a palace gate dated from 1367, one of the few such gates that still exists in the city. Wuchaomen Park has a view over tree-lined Yudao road from the top of a grey-bricked structure. It has a reputation for saxophone playing and opera singing by local residents. Some visitors also practice tai chi or walk backwards in circles.

The City of Nanjing has identified it as one of the top five parks in the city. Others are Mochou Lake Park, Xuanwu Lake, Qingliangshan Park and China Gate Castle Park.

References

Parks in Nanjing